"A Ballade of Suicide" is a ballade by G. K. Chesterton, originally published in his 1915 collection Poems.

External links

 The G. K.Chesterton web site: more works by G. K. Chesterton
 

Poems by G. K. Chesterton